The 2012–13 LEB Oro season was the 17th season of the Liga Española de Baloncesto, a Spanish basketball league. It was named Adecco Oro as its sponsored identity. The champion of the regular season would be promoted to Liga ACB. The teams between second and ninth position will play a best of five games play off, where the winner would be promoted too to the higher division.

Competition format

Eligibility of players
All teams must have in their roster:
 A minimum of six players who played in Spain during three season being between 15 and 20 years old.
 A maximum of two non-EU players. This players can be replaced by players from the EU or ACP countries.
 A maximum of three players from the EU or ACP countries.

Teams can not sign any player after February 28, 2012.

Regular season
Each team of every division has to play with all the other teams of its division twice, once at home and the other at the opponent's stadium.

Like many other leagues in continental Europe, the Liga LEB takes a winter break once each team has played half its schedule. One feature of the league that may be unusual to North American observers is that the two halves of the season are played in the same order—that is, the order of each team's first-half fixtures is repeated in the second half of the season, with the only difference being the arenas used. This procedure is typical in Europe; it is also used by La Liga in football.

Since the first round of the second leg, if two or more teams have accumulated the same number of winning games, the criteria of tie-breaking are these:
 Head-to-head winning games.
 Head-to-head points coefficient.
 Total points coefficient.

After the first leg of the season, the two top qualified teams will play the Copa Príncipe de Asturias and the leader will be the host team.

At the final of the season:
 The regular season winner promotes directly to Liga ACB.
 Teams qualified between 2nd and 9th, will join the promotion play-offs to ACB.
 Teams qualified in positions 12th and 13th will play the relegation playoffs.
 Team qualified in last position is relegated directly to LEB Plata.

Team information
New teams in the league:
 Lucentum Alicante (sold its berth in Liga ACB to CB Canarias)
 River Andorra (promoted as 2011–12 LEB Plata champion)
 Club Ourense Baloncesto (promoted as 2011–12 LEB Plata runner-up)
 FC Barcelona Regal B (achieved a vacant berth in the league)
 Leyma Natura Básquet Coruña (achieved a vacant berth in the league)
 Força Lleida CE (new creation team, achieved a vacant berth in the league)

Teams that left the league:
 CB Canarias (promoted to Liga ACB as champion of 2011–12 LEB Oro, bought Lucentum Alicante's spot)
 Menorca Bàsquet (dissolved after its promotion to Liga ACB as 2011–12 LEB Oro runner-up)
 Lleida Basquetbol (will not join any competition)
 UB La Palma (dissolved)
 CB Sant Josep Girona (will play in Liga EBA)
 Bàsquet Mallorca (will play in Liga EBA)
 Baloncesto León (dissolved)
 CB Tarragona (will play in Liga EBA)
 Clínicas Rincón (relegated to LEB Plata)
 CB Granada (dissolved after its relegation to LEB Plata)

Managerial changes

Before the start of the season

During the season

Regular season

League table

(C) = Copa Príncipe de Asturias champion

Positions by round

Results

Copa Príncipe de Asturias
At the half of the league, the two first teams in the table play the Copa Príncipe de Asturias at home of the winner of the first half season (17th round). If this team doesn't want to host the Copa Príncipe, the second qualified can do it. If nobody wants to host it, the Federation will propose a neutral venue.

The Champion of this Cup joined the play-offs as first qualified if it finishes the league between the 2nd and the 5th qualified. The Copa Príncipe was played on February 1, 2013.

Teams qualified

The game

Playoffs

Promotion playoffs

Relegation playoffs
The loser of a best-of-five series will be relegated to LEB Plata.

Stats leaders in regular season

Points

Rebounds

Assists

Performance Index Rating

Awards and trophies

All LEB Oro team
  Mikel Uriz (Knet)
  Anthony Winchester (CB Breogán)
  Marc Blanch (River Andorra)
  Urko Otegui (Palencia Baloncesto)
  Ondřej Starosta (Planasa Navarra)

MVP of the regular season
  Ondřej Starosta (Planasa Navarra)

Coach of the season
  Andreu Casadevall (Ford Burgos)

LEB Oro Rising star
  Mario Hezonja (FC Barcelona Regal B)

MVP week by week

Regular season

Playoffs

References

External links
 Official website
 LEB Oro page in the FEB website

 
LEB Oro seasons
LEB2
Spain
Second level Spanish basketball league seasons